Wagner Township is a township in Clayton County, Iowa, USA.  As of the 2000 census, its population was 441.

History
Wagner Township was organized in 1852. It is named for John Wagner, Sr., who settled there in 1846.

Geography
According to the USGS, it contains nine cemeteries: Clark, Eno, Farmersburg-Wagner, Gooding, Johanningmeier, Norway, Patterson, United Brethren and Weymouth.

The streams of Howard Creek, Silver Creek and Wagner run through this township.

Notes

References
 USGS Geographic Names Information System (GNIS)

External links
 US-Counties.com
 City-Data.com

Townships in Clayton County, Iowa
Townships in Iowa
1852 establishments in Iowa
Populated places established in 1852